Joanne's Bed and Back was a retailer of specialty beds, mattresses, and chairs in the Mid-Atlantic region of the United States. The chain, which is based in Beltsville, Maryland, primarily has stores in the U.S. states of Maryland and Virginia. The company also had locations in New York in the past, when two stores opened in Manhattan during the 1990s. The chain markets to those with back problems who are looking for furniture to meet their special needs.

The company was founded in 1977 by JoAnne Schatz, and later expanded to more than a dozen locations. The company's greatest success came during the mid-1990s, when the chain doubled its number of stores. At its height, the chain had a total of 14 stores.

During the slower economic times of the 2000s, the chain's success declined. In April 2008, the company filed for Chapter 11 bankruptcy, and was acquired by Virginia-based Healthy Back, which planned to close half its stores. The stores are currently closed and the web address is for sale as of summer 2019.

External links

References

Furniture retailers of the United States
Mattress retailers of the United States
Ergonomics companies
Companies that filed for Chapter 11 bankruptcy in 2008
Retail companies established in 1977
Defunct companies based in Maryland
Retail companies disestablished in 2008
1977 establishments in Maryland
2008 disestablishments in Maryland